1846 Bengt, provisional designation , is a dark asteroid from the inner regions of the asteroid belt, approximately 11 kilometers in diameter. Discovered by the Palomar–Leiden survey in 1960, it was named for Danish astronomer Bengt Strömgren.

Discovery 

Bengt was discovered on 24 September 1960, by Dutch astronomer couple Ingrid and Cornelis van Houten in collaboration with Tom Gehrels, who took the photographic plates at Palomar Observatory in California.

The survey designation "P-L" stands for Palomar–Leiden, named after Palomar Observatory and Leiden Observatory, which collaborated on the fruitful Palomar–Leiden survey in the 1960s. Gehrels used Palomar's Samuel Oschin telescope (also known as the 48-inch Schmidt Telescope), and shipped the photographic plates to Ingrid and Cornelis van Houten at Leiden Observatory where astrometry was carried out. The trio are credited with several thousand asteroid discoveries.

The observation arc starts 3 years prior to its official discovery observation, with its first used identification  made at Goethe Link Observatory in 1957.

Orbit and classification 

Bengt orbits the Sun in the inner main-belt at a distance of 2.0–2.7 AU once every 3 years and 7 months (1,306 days). Its orbit has an eccentricity of 0.14 and an inclination of 3° with respect to the ecliptic.

Physical characteristics 

Based on preliminary results by NASA's Wide-field Infrared Survey Explorer with its subsequent NEOWISE mission, Bengt measures 10.998 kilometers in diameter and its surface has an albedo of 0.047, which is typical for carbonaceous C-type asteroids. As of 2017, no rotational lightcurve has been obtained.

Naming 

This minor planet was named after renowned Danish astronomer Bengt Strömgren (1908–1987), on the occasion of his 70th birthday. He was an authority in the field of stellar structure and stellar evolution, director of the Yerkes Observatory from 1951 to 1957, and president of the International Astronomical Union (1970–1973). The official  was published by the Minor Planet Center on 1 November 1978.

References

External links 
 Asteroid Lightcurve Database (LCDB), query form (info )
 Dictionary of Minor Planet Names, Google books
 Asteroids and comets rotation curves, CdR – Observatoire de Genève, Raoul Behrend
 Discovery Circumstances: Numbered Minor Planets (1)-(5000) – Minor Planet Center
 
 

001846
6553
Discoveries by Cornelis Johannes van Houten
Discoveries by Ingrid van Houten-Groeneveld
Discoveries by Tom Gehrels
Named minor planets
19600924